Discophlebia is a genus of moths of the family Oenosandridae first described by Rudolf Felder in 1874.

Species
Discophlebia blosyrodes Turner, 1903
Discophlebia catocalina R. Felder, 1874
Discophlebia celaena (Turner, 1903)
Discophlebia lipauges Turner, 1917
Discophlebia lucasii Rosenstock, 1885

Oenosandridae
Moths of Australia